Enija-Anna Vaivode is a Latvian women's football goalkeeper currently playing for Riga United Ladies  in the Latvia women's A-Liga.

She is the national team goalkeeper of the Latvian national team.

She previously played for Rīgas FS in the Latvian Women's League.

References

Latvian women's footballers
1993 births
Living people
Expatriate women's footballers in Finland
Latvia women's international footballers
Women's association football goalkeepers
Rīgas FS players